Nocturna may refer to:
 Nocturna (DC Comics), a comic book supervillainess
 Nocturna (film), a 2007 animated feature
 Nocturna: Granddaughter of Dracula, a 1979 disco film

See also 
 Nocturne (disambiguation)